Bakari Shamis Faki is a Member of Parliament in the National Assembly of Tanzania.

External links
 Parliament of Tanzania  website

Tanzanian MPs 2005–2010
Living people
Year of birth missing (living people)
Place of birth missing (living people)
21st-century Tanzanian politicians